List of municipalities in Georgia can refer to:

 List of municipalities in Georgia (country)
 List of municipalities in Georgia (U.S. state)